Pârâul Ursului may refer to:

 Pârâul Ursului (Tazlău)
 Pârâul Ursului, a tributary of the Lotru in Vâlcea County
 Pârâul Ursului (Râul Negru)

See also 
 Ursu River (disambiguation)
 Ursu (surname)